Ghuwara is a town and a nagar panchayat in Chhatarpur district in the Indian state of Madhya Pradesh.Also known as the heart of Bundelkhand

Demographics
 India census, Ghuwara had a population of 10,813. Males constitute 53% of the population and females 47%. Ghuwara has an average literacy rate of 48%, lower than the national average of 59.5%: male literacy is 58%, and female literacy is 37%. In Ghuwara, 20% of the population is under 6 years of age.

 India census, Ghuwara had a population of 22,311.

References

Bundelkhand
Chhatarpur